Constanța Shipyard  is the largest shipyard in Romania and one of the largest in Europe having a market share of 20% in the Black Sea basin.

History
The Constanța Shipyard was first mentioned as the Craft Repair Shop within the Constanța Harbour area in 1892 by the Ministry for Public Works. In July 1905, the shipyard housed the  Russian battleship Potemkin and refloated her after she was half scuttled by her mutinous crew. During World War II, the shipyard provided repair and maintenance to the Italian flotilla of midget submarines operating in the Black Sea. Together with the Galați shipyard, it also rebuilt, maintained and repaired numerous German R-boats during the War. 1950 the shipyard began to construct ships, pontoons, tugboats and towboats.

After the construction of a large bulk carrier Giuseppe Lembo in 1994, the shipyard reprofiled its activity to construct only small ships. Only after the privatisation in 2002 the shipyard restarted to construct large-scale ships. 

References

Buildings and structures in Constanța
Shipyards of Romania
Privatized companies in Romania
Companies listed on the Bucharest Stock Exchange
Companies based in Constanța